Baz Kia Gurab (also Romanized as Bāz Kīā Gūrāb, Bāzkīā Gūrāb, Bāz Kīyā Gūrāb, and Bāz Keyā Gūrāb; also known as Bāzgīā Gūrāb, Bazkiya Koorab, Bāzkiya Qurāb, Blzkiya-Kurab, and Keyā Gūrāb) is a village in Baz Kia Gurab Rural District, in the Central District of Lahijan County, Gilan Province, Iran. At the 2006 census, its population was 4,213, in 1,220 families.

References 

Populated places in Lahijan County